Dietfurt is a town in the district of Neumarkt in Bavaria, Germany. The town is situated on the river Altmühl, and is 38 km west of Regensburg,  30 km north of Ingolstadt, and is located 364 meters above sea level.

Overview
Dietfurt is known as the "Bavarian China", Chinese culture is the theme adopted for Carnival in Dietfurt, and the city promotes other Chinese cultural activities such as courses in Qigong.

Mayor 
The mayor of Dietfurt is Bernd Mayr, elected in March 2020.

Notable people 

 Argula von Grumbach, (1492-1568) Protestant publicist and reformer, lived and worked in Dietfurt from 1516 onwards 
 Michael Wittmann (1914-1944), German Panzer commander and panzer ace of the Waffen-SS, born in Vogelthal district

References

External links

 
Bavaria's Chinese Carnival

Neumarkt (district)
Chinese culture